The Chevrolet Cobalt is a compact car introduced by Chevrolet in 2004 for the 2005 model year. The Cobalt replaced both the Cavalier and the Toyota-based Geo/Chevrolet Prizm as Chevrolet's compact car. The Cobalt was available as both a coupe and sedan, as well as a sport compact version dubbed the Cobalt SS. Like the Chevrolet HHR and the Saturn ION, it was based on the GM Delta platform.

A Pontiac version was sold in the United States and Mexico under the G5 name for 2007–2009.  It was sold as the Pontiac G4 in Mexico for 2005–2006 and as the Pontiac G5 in Canada for its entire run (where it was briefly known as the Pontiac Pursuit and later Pontiac G5 Pursuit). The G5 replaced the Cavalier-related Pontiac Sunfire. While the Cobalt was available as a 2-door coupe and a 4-door sedan in all markets it was offered in, the G5 was only available as a coupé in the United States while a sedan version was sold alongside the coupé in Canada and Mexico.

As with their predecessors, all Cobalts and its Pontiac equivalents were manufactured at GM's plant in Ramos Arizpe, Mexico and Lordstown, Ohio. The United States Environmental Protection Agency classified the Cobalt as a subcompact car.



First generation (2004)

Specifications
The front suspension was independent with MacPherson struts, while a semi-independent torsion beam was used in the rear. For 2009, the United States Environmental Protection Agency fuel economy was increased to  city/ highway with automatic transmission, and  city/ highway with manual transmission.

Year-to-year changes
 2006: A non-supercharged Cobalt SS was added to the lineup. This car was equipped with a 2.4 L naturally aspirated Ecotec inline-4. The LS became the base model while the LT was marketed as a mid-range package; the top level trim was now the LTZ. In addition, as with most other GM vehicles that year, GM's Mark of Excellence symbol was added to both front fenders near the doors.
 2007: Both engines were retuned for more power while retaining the same fuel economy. Other changes include a new console, new steering wheel and new radio head unit that features an audio input jack. In addition, all models except the LS and LT1 now used a 5x110 wheel bolt pattern. The LS and LT1 retained the standard 4x100. In addition, the 2007 model year marked the introduction of a new 32-bit computer that replaced the 16-bit unit from 2006.
 2008: The 2.4 L naturally aspirated, high-output SS coupe and SS sedan were renamed to just "Sport Coupe" and "Sport Sedan" respectively. The new Cobalt SS features a  turbocharged engine, replacing the Supercharged engine which was offered from 2005–2007. At mid-year, the fuel economy was increased to 5.5–7.5 km/liter city, 9–11 km/lite highway on the LS and 1LT, coupe and sedan models with manual transmission; now labeled with XFE badging (X-tra Fuel Economy). XM Radio, side-impact air bags for improved safety, and MP3 player were now standard instead of optional. StabiliTrak stability control system was introduced. Other changes included the adding and removal of several exterior and interior colors. The new SS (turbocharged) coupe launched near the end of May 2008, as it was a facelift from the 2005–2007 version.
 2008 (Special Edition "Revolution" Package): The special edition package for the Cobalt was introduced on August 16, 2008, which featured all the options that were available on the previous SS models except the turbocharged 2.0 engine. Instead it was once again built with the 2.4 naturally aspirated engine similar to the Cobalt Sport models. The special edition package could come with a sunroof, GM ground effects kit, the Getrag F23 5-speed manual transmission, and additionally the 5 lug wheel bearings that the SS editions featured. The special editions were all had a "Special Edition" badge and came with unique variations of colors, and racing stripes.
 2009: The 2.4 L naturally aspirated "Sport Coupe and "Sport Sedan" models were both deleted, along with the 2.2 L L61 engine. Both were replaced by the 2.2 L LAP engine thus providing better fuel economy and more power. Also, a 2.0 LNF Turbo SS sedan was added to the lineup. Three exterior colors were changed, and an interior color deleted. Bluetooth capabilities were added.  An option for a reconfigurable performance display  available on the SS coupe, could read out various engine output data and alter performance settings. 
 2009 (Team Canada Edition Package): For Canada, a "Team Canada Edition Package" was offered beginning in 2009 and continuing into the 2010 model year for the LT.
 2010: The car was replaced by the Chevy Cruze. In Canada, the Team Canada Edition Package was now standard on all LT models, and side-impact head curtain air bags were finally standard on all models.

Safety
According to the Insurance Institute for Highway Safety (IIHS) the Cobalt receives an overall top score of "Good" for front collisions.
However, it receives a "Poor" overall score for side impacts without side curtain airbags, and an "Acceptable" overall score with side curtain airbags. In 2008, side curtain airbags became standard, but the Cobalt's structure remains the same and consequently in structure/safety category of the IIHS's side impact test the Cobalt receives a "Marginal" score. Side airbags are limited to the curtain type; torso type side airbags are unavailable. According to the IIHS's injury measurements taken from the side impact test, the driver's torso is given a "Marginal" score.

The IIHS also found 2005-08 model year Cobalts had the highest fatality rate in the small 4 door car class, with 117 deaths per million registered years compared to its class average of 71.

2010 NHTSA sedan crash test:
 Frontal Driver: 
 Frontal Passenger: 
 Side Driver: 
 Side Rear Passenger: 
 Rollover: 

Before 2009 the Cobalt only offered stability control as an option on Sport models.

Defects and recalls
In early 2007, 98,000 Cobalt coupes from the 2005–06 model years were recalled after it was discovered they did not meet federal safety requirements because of a lack of adequate padding in a specific area of the vehicle's trim. This resulted in an unacceptable vulnerability to head injuries, though GM claimed the vulnerability would only affect motorists not wearing a seat belt.

On March 2, 2010, GM announced a recall of 1.3 million compact cars in North America, including the Chevrolet Cobalt, because of power steering problems. GM implemented the repair on older models before fixing more recent models, as the car was replaced by the Chevrolet Cruze in late 2010. The Pontiac G5 and its international variants were also affected, though GM had already ended production of the Pontiac brand by that point.

On September 28, 2012, GM announced a recall of 40,859 cars including the Chevrolet Cobalt from the 2007-09 model year because of a potential fuel leak.  Although the recall was limited to five states, vehicles from other southern states were covered for repair when summer heat caused cracks in the fuel reservoir assembly.  The fuel vapor leak could be detected during hot days by a gasoline smell in the vicinity of the car.

Faulty ignition switches in the Cobalts, which cut power to the car while in motion, were eventually linked to many crashes resulting in fatalities, starting with a teenager in 2005 who drove her new Cobalt into a tree.  The switch continued to be used in the manufacture of the vehicles even after the problem was known to GM. On February 21, 2014, GM recalled over 700,000 Cobalts for issues traceable to the defective ignition switches.  In May 2014 the NHTSA fined the company $35 million for failing to recall cars with faulty ignition switches for a decade, despite knowing there was a problem with the switches. Thirteen deaths were linked to the faulty switches during the time the company failed to recall the cars.

Engines

Sales

Pontiac G5

The Pontiac G5 was a rebadged version of the Chevrolet Cobalt.

The Pontiac Pursuit was originally introduced in Canada as a sedan in 2005. The Pontiac Pursuit was only available as a sedan and was only sold in Canada from 2005 to 2006. In 2006, another version of the vehicle was released called the Pontiac G5 Pursuit in Canada, but it was now available as both a sedan and a coupe. This vehicle was available as both a sedan and coupe also in Mexico as the Pontiac G4 from 2005 to 2006.

In the United States, the Pontiac G5 went on sale in 2006 as a 2007 model, serving as the replacement for the Pontiac Sunfire. The Pontiac G5 in the United States was only available as a coupe. However, in Canada, and in Mexico, the Pontiac G5 went on sale in early 2007 as a 2007 model, available as both a sedan and coupe.

General Motors discontinued the Pontiac G5 in the United States in 2009. One year later in 2010, General Motors discontinued the Pontiac G5 in both Canada and Mexico. The G5 was discontinued as a direct result of General Motors phasing out the Pontiac brand in 2010. In the United States and in Mexico, the Chevrolet Cruze had replaced both Chevrolet Cobalt and the Pontiac G5. The Buick Verano had replaced the Pontiac G5 in Canada.

Replacement

In 2009, Chevrolet launched the Cobalt's eventual successor, the Chevrolet Cruze (based on the new Delta II platform), in Europe, with launches in other markets (including the US) following in 2010. The Cobalt ended production on June 23, 2010. With the discontinuation of the Pontiac brand by GM in 2010, the Buick Verano is marketed as the G5's successor in Canada, while the Cruze serves as a de facto replacement for the Pontiac G5 in the United States.

Gallery

Second generation (2011)

In 2011, General Motors Brazil introduced a new model bearing the Cobalt name in the Brazilian market. This Cobalt replaced the aging local Chevrolet Astra. The car is equipped with a 1.4 Econo.Flex engine. Although sporting a similar front end style, it is not directly related to the Chevrolet Agile, since it shares the overall underpinnings with the 2011 Chevrolet Sonic,  while the Agile is derived from the considerably older Opel Corsa B, from 1993.

Chevrolet had no plans to bring the Cobalt to the North American market, which already had the Chevrolet Sonic and Chevrolet Spark as the subcompact cars in the continent. In GM Brazil's line-up, it is situated above the Chevrolet Prisma and below the Chevrolet Cruze.

In January 2013, the Cobalt was launched in the Russian market, where it was imported from Uzbekistan. The Cobalt was retired in Russia in December 2015, when Chevrolet decided to minimize its presence only to its iconic models. However, in late 2016, it was reintroduced under the new Ravon marque as the Ravon R4.

The Chevrolet Cobalt was assembled in Colombia too. It was equipped with a simple range of two versions and a single 1.8-liter 8-valve 106-horsepower engine. With a very discreet commercial performance and a taxi variant, its production in the Colombian market ended in early 2016.

The Cobalt received a facelift in late 2015 for the 2016 model year. Its main rivals are the Nissan Versa and the Renault Logan.

In Brazil, production ended in late 2019, with 2020 being the final model year.  The Cobalt has been succeeded by the Chevrolet Onix Plus sedan, which achieved higher sales upon its launch in 2019.

After UzAuto phased out the Ravon brand in 2020, the Ravon R4 was once again renamed the Chevrolet Cobalt. The Cobalt / R4 made by UzAuto never received the 2015 facelift seen in other markets.

References

External links

Chevrolet Cobalt at Chevrolet

Cobalt
Compact cars
Front-wheel-drive vehicles
Coupés
Sedans
Cars introduced in 2004
Motor vehicles manufactured in the United States
Partial zero-emissions vehicles
2010s cars